The 81st season of the Campeonato Catarinense began on January 11, 2006, and ended on April 9, 2006.

Format

Divisão Principal

First stage
Teams are divided into two groups of six teams.
Double round-robin, in which all teams from one group play home-and-away games against all teams within the group.

Second stage
Top 4 teams from each group of first stage are divided into two groups of four teams.
Double round-robin, in which all teams from one group play home-and-away games against all teams within the group.

Third stage
Home-and-away playoffs with the top 2 teams of each group.

The winner of the third stage is crowned the champion. The champion qualify to Campeonato Brasileiro Série C 2006 and qualify to Copa do Brasil 2007

The teams that do not participate in Brazilian Série A and Brazilian Série B will participate in Divisão Especial.

First stage

Group A

Group B

Second stage

Group C

Group D

Third stage

Semi-finals

*The first games were played in Team 1 Stadium
Italic: Teams qualify to Final

Final

* The Game 2 was played in Florianópolis, because the Figueirense Futebol Clube had better Punctuation in the two stages (Stage 1 points + Stage 2 points).

Final standings

* Joinville qualify to Série C, because Figueirense already was qualify to Serie A.

Other Divisions

Divisão Especial: 12 Teams

Champion: Joinville
Runner-up: Marcílio Dias - Qualify to Campeonato Brasileiro Série C 2006*
11th placed: Cidade Azul - Release to Divisão de Accesso 2006
12th placed: Lages - Release to Divisão de Accesso 2006

* Marcílio Dias qualify to Série C, because Joinville already  was qualify to Serie C 

Divisão de Accesso: 10 teams

Champion: Camboriuense - Qualify to Divisão Especial 2007
Runner-up: Videira - Qualify to Divisão Especial 2007

Champion

Campeonato Catarinense seasons
Cat